Rhodogastria amasis, the tri-coloured tiger moth, is a moth in the family Erebidae. It was described by Pieter Cramer in 1779. It is found in Lesotho, Mozambique, South Africa and Zimbabwe.

The larvae feed on Acacia, Calodendrum, Cassia, Cestrum, Clerodendrum, Cotyledon, Passiflora caerulea, Rhus, Senecio, and Tagetes species. Though they are heavily armed with irritant urticating hairs they are readily eaten by fiscal flycatchers and Cape robin-chats that scrub off their hairs against the ground and swallow the larvae whole. Some cuckoos eat the larvae too.

References

Moths described in 1779
Spilosomina
Moths of Sub-Saharan Africa